Noorda margaronialis is a moth in the family Crambidae. It was described by George Hampson in 1912. It is found in the Punjab region of what was British India.

References

Moths described in 1912
Crambidae